The 1992–93 Rugby League Divisional Premiership  was the seventh end-of-season Rugby League Divisional Premiership competition.

The competition was contested by 12 teams; the top four teams in the second Division and the top eight teams in the third Division. The winners were Featherstone Rovers.

First round

Second round

Replay

Semi-finals

Final

See also
 1992–93 Rugby Football League season

Notes

References
 

Rugby League Divisional Premiership